Fanny Moser may refer to:

Fanny Moser (baroness), known as the richest woman in Eastern Europe
Fanny Moser (scientist), known as a zoologist and investigator of parapsychology